Nävekvarn is a locality situated in Tunaberg, Nyköping Municipality, Södermanland County, Sweden with 795 inhabitants in 2010.

Election results 
Nävekvarn has a municipal constituency that covers the locality and the surrounding forests. In all references, the results for Nävekvarn are being found under Nyköping's.

Riksdag

References 

Populated places in Södermanland County
Populated places in Nyköping Municipality